Gregory Alchevsky (1866 in Kharkov, Russian Empire – 1920 in Moscow) was a Ukrainian and Russian composer.

Gregory was the son of a mining engineer, industrialist and banker Aleksey Alchevsky, and teacher Khrystyna Zhuravlyova. Gregory also had two sіblings named Ivan and Khrystina. Ivan Alchevsky became a renowned opera singer and Khrystina Alchevskaya was a respected poet. Gregory Alchevsky himself, worked as a teacher of voice and piano, composer and singer. He was a graduate of the Moscow Conservatory of Music. His works include: several textbooks for vocalists, a symphony called "Alyosha Popovich", arrangements of Russian and Ukrainian Folk songs, and a series of solo works to the words of Apollon Maykov, Mikhail Lermontov, Tatiana Shchepkina-Kupernik, Yakov Polonsky, Taras Shevchenko, Ivan Franko, Lesia Ukrainka etc.

References
Dytyniak Maria Ukrainian Composers – A Bio-bibliographic Guide – Research report No. 14, 1896, Canadian Institute of Ukrainian Studies, University of Alberta, Canada.

Sources 
 Hryhorii Alchevsky
 Oleksii Alchevsky
Khrystyna Alchevska

1866 births
1920 deaths
Musicians from Kharkiv
People from Kharkovsky Uyezd
Russian composers
Russian male composers
Ukrainian classical composers
National University of Kharkiv alumni